Andressa Cholodovskis Lima (born October 11, 1997 in Belo Horizonte) is a Brazilian swimmer.

At the 2018 José Finkel Trophy, she broke the South American record in 4×200m freestyle relay with a time of 7:50.57 along with Ana Carolina Vieira, Camila Mello and Maria Paula Heitmann.

References

Brazilian female medley swimmers
1997 births
Living people

Sportspeople from Belo Horizonte
20th-century Brazilian women
21st-century Brazilian women